Tinder is an online dating and geosocial networking application. In Tinder, users "swipe right" to like or "swipe left" to dislike other users' profiles, which include their photos, a short bio, and a list of their interests. Tinder uses a "double opt-in" system where both users must like each other before they can exchange messages.

Tinder was launched by Sean Rad at a hackathon held at the Hatch Labs incubator in West Hollywood in 2012. By 2014, Tinder was registering about one billion daily "swipes" and reported that users logged into the app on average 11 times a day. In 2015, Tinder was the fifth highest-grossing mobile app, and by 2019 it was the highest-grossing app. In 2020, Tinder had 6.2 million subscribers and 75 million monthly active users. As of 2021, Tinder has recorded more than 65 billion matches worldwide.

History
The original prototype for Tinder, called 'MatchBox', was built during a hackathon in February 2012 by Sean Rad and engineer Joe Munoz. The hackathon was hosted by Hatch Labs, a NY-based startup incubator with a West Hollywood outpost. Realizing the name MatchBox was too similar to Match.com, Rad, his co-founders, and early employees renamed the company Tinder. The company's flame-themed logo remained consistent throughout the rebranding.

2012: Prototype and launch 
In January 2012, Rad was hired as General Manager of Cardify, a credit card loyalty app launched by Hatch Labs. During a hackathon in his first month, he presented the idea for a dating app called Matchbox. Rad and engineer Joe Munoz built the prototype for MatchBox and presented the "double opt-in" dating app on February 16, 2012.

In March, co-founder Jonathan Badeen (front-end operator and later Tinder's CSO), and Chris Gulczynski (designer and later Tinder's CCO) joined Cardify.

In May, while Cardify was going through Apple's App Store approval process, the team focused on MatchBox. During the same period, Alexa Mateen (Justin's sister) and her friend, Whitney Wolfe Herd, were hired as Cardify sales reps.

In August 2012, Cardify was abandoned, Matchbox was renamed Tinder, and co-founder Justin Mateen (marketer and later Tinder's CMO) joined the company.

In September 2012, Tinder was soft-launched in the App Store. It was then launched at several college campuses and started to expand quickly.

2013: Swipe feature developed
Tinder's selection function, which was initially click-based, evolved into the company's swipe feature. The feature was established when Rad and Badeen, interested in gamification, modeled the feature off a deck of cards. Badeen then streamlined the action following a trial on a bathroom mirror. Tinder has been credited with popularizing the swipe feature many other companies now use.

2014–2016: Growth 
By October 2014, Tinder users completed over one billion swipes per day, producing about twelve million matches per day. By this time, Tinder's average user generally spent about 90 minutes a day on the app.

Founder Sean Rad served as Tinder's CEO until March 2015, when he was replaced by former eBay and Microsoft executive Chris Payne. Rad returned as CEO in August 2015.

In 2015 Tinder released its "Rewind" function and its "Super Like" function and retired its Tinder "Moments" and "Last Active" feature. In January 2015, Tinder acquired Chill, the developer of Tappy, a mobile messenger that uses "images and ephemerality".

In 2016, Tinder was the most popular dating app in the United States, holding a 25.6% market share of monthly users. On the company's third-quarter earnings call, Match Group's CEO Greg Blatt described the popular dating app Tinder as a "rocket" and the "future of this business."

In September 2016, the company also initiated testing of its "Boost" functionality in Australia. The feature went live for all users in October of that year.

In October 2016, Tinder announced the opening of its first office in Silicon Valley in the hope of more effectively recruiting technical employees.

In November 2016, Tinder introduced more options for gender selection.

In December 2016, Greg Blatt, CEO and chairman of Tinder's parent company, Match Group, took over as interim CEO of Tinder. Sean Rad stepped down as CEO of Tinder, becoming chairman of the company.

2017: Merger with Match
Tinder had annual revenue of $403 million and accounted for 31% of Match Group's 2017 annual revenue of $1.28 billion. In the same year, Tinder surpassed Netflix as the highest-grossing app on the app store. Match Group's market cap as of December 28, 2017, was $10.03 billion.

In March 2017, Tinder launched Tinder Online, a web-optimized version of the dating app. Initially, it was only available in Argentina, Brazil, Colombia, Indonesia, Italy, Mexico, Philippines and Sweden and did not include special features such as "Super Likes" or "Tinder Boost". Tinder Online launched globally in September 2017. During the launch of the official web version, Tinder took legal action to shut down third-party apps providing a web extension to use the Tinder app from a desktop computer.

In July 2017, Match Group merged with Tinder for approximately $3 billion.

In August 2017, Tinder launched an additional subscription service, Tinder Gold, that allowed subscribers to see which users 'swiped back' without alerting those users. Tinder Gold quickly became a successful revenue source for the company, boosting Match Group's total revenue by 19% compared to 2016. This boost in revenue and profits came as Tinder's paid member count rose by a record 476,000 to more than 2.5 million, mainly due to product changes and technology improvements. The popularity of Tinder Gold led to a surge in Match Group shares and recorded high share prices. Greg Blatt, Match Group's then-CEO, called Tinder's performance "fantastic," and stated that the company was driving most of Match Group's growth in late 2017.

Blatt resigned from Match Group and Tinder in 2017 following allegations of sexual harassment. He was replaced by Elie Seidman.

2018–2019
In 2018, Tinder had annual revenue of $805 million and accounted for 48% of Match Group's 2018 annual revenue of $1.67 billion. Match Group's market cap as of December 30, 2018, was $15.33 billion.

On August 6, 2018, Tinder had over 3.7 million paid subscribers, up 81 percent over the same quarter in 2017. On August 21, 2018, Tinder launched Tinder University, a feature that allows college students to connect with other students on their campus and at nearby schools.

In 2019, Tinder had annual revenue of $1.152 billion and accounted for 58% of Match Group's total 2019 annual revenue of $2.0 billion. Match Group's market cap as of December 30, 2019, was $21.09 billion.

On May 10, it was reported that Tinder was planning for a lighter version app called Tinder Lite aimed at growing markets where data usage, bandwidth and storage space are a concern.

On August 6, Tinder had 5.2 million paying subscribers at the end of 2019's second quarter, up 1.5 million from the year-ago quarter and up 503,000 from the first quarter of 2019. Tinder became the highest-grossing non-gaming app, beating Netflix. Tinder's subscriber growth led Match Group's shares to the best single-day gain in their history on August 7, adding more than $5 billion to the company's market capitalization.

On September 12, Tinder relaunched Swipe Night, an interactive series where users make decisions following a storyline. Swipe Night had previously been launched in October 2019. It was slated to be launched internationally in March 2020, but it was postponed until September due to the COVID-19 pandemic. Swipe Nights international launch included multiple countries and languages. The three major decisions made in each episode of the interactive series are displayed on the user's profile for potential matches to see.

In 2019, Tinder had annual revenue of $1.2 billion.

2020
In 2020, Tinder had annual revenue of $1.355 billion and accounted for 58% of Match Group's 2020 revenue of $2.34 billion. Match Group's market cap as of December 23, 2020, was $40.45 billion.

In January 2020, the Tinder administration enabled a panic button and anti-catfishing technology to improve the safety of US users. In the future, these features are planned to become globally available. If something goes wrong on a date, a user can hit a panic button, transmit accurate location data, and call emergency services. To use this feature, users need to download and install the Noonlight app. Also, before going to a meeting, users are required to take selfies to prove their photos in Tinder profiles match their real identities.

In response to the global COVID-19 pandemic, in March 2020, Tinder temporarily made its Passport feature available for free to all of its users worldwide. Previously this feature had been only accessible to users who had purchased a subscription.

In August, Tinder revealed plans for their Platinum subscription plan, which gives users access to more features for a higher price than gold. The same month, Jim Lanzone took over as CEO.

On September 1, Tinder was banned in Pakistan in a crackdown on what the Pakistani government deemed "immoral content".

On November 4, Tinder reported higher than expected third-quarter earnings and significant platform growth amidst the COVID-19 pandemic: the app grew its user base by 15% and its subscriber count by 16% since the third quarter of 2019. According to Business Insider, Tinder's growth was fueled by a large population that turned towards online dating in response to increasing social isolation and health risks. In 2020, Match Group products, including Tinder, released video-based features to facilitate long-distance dating. Tinder had 6.6 million subscribers globally in November, growing from 6.2 million reported in June.

2021
Match Group's market cap as of October 14, 2021, was $44.59 billion.

In February 2021, Tinder announced it would be launching a range of mobile accessories under the brand name Tinder Made. The app reported that month an all-time high in users ready to "go on a date" as opposed to virtual and online chats during the height of the pandemic in the United States. It gave away pairs of COVID-19 testing kits to some matches to encourage responsible behavior as users begin to meet in person again.

In March 2021, Tinder announced a service that would let users run background checks on potential matches after an investment in Garbo, a company that "collects public records and reports of violence or abuse, including arrests, convictions, restraining orders, harassment, and other violent crimes". Garbo does not publicize drug possession charges or traffic violations, citing disproportionate incarceration. This service comes with a fee that has not yet been disclosed to users.

In August 2021, Tinder announced an ID verification service to mitigate catfishing on the platform.

In September 2021, Jim Lanzone announced that he was stepping down from his position of Chief Executive to pursue a new role with Yahoo. This prompted Tinder to name Renate Nyborg as CEO. She is the company's first female CEO.

In December 2021, Nyborg announced that the company is working on creating a metaverse called Tinderverse, a shared virtual reality. The company is also testing Tinder Coins, in-app currency users can earn as a reward for good behavior, allowing them to pay for the platform's premium services.

Operation
After building a profile with a Meta login or cell phone number, users can swipe yes (right) or no (left) to determine if they have a potential romantic match. Chatting on Tinder is only available between two users that have swiped right on one another's photos. The selections a user makes are not known to other users unless two individuals swipe right on each other's profiles. However, once the user has matches on the app, they are able to send personal photos, called "Tinder Moments", to all matches at once, allowing each match to like or not like the photos. The site also has verified profiles for public figures, so that celebrities and other public figures can verify they are who they are when using the app.

The app is available in about 190 countries, and can be used in 45 languages.

Financials
Since merging with Tinder in July 2017, Match Group's market capitalization has grown from $8.34 billion to $44.59 billion as of October 14, 2021. In August 2021, Morgan Stanley valued Tinder's worth at $42 billion. The valuation is based on a multiple of 40x EBITDA, similar to its counterpart Bumble.

In March 2014, media and internet conglomerate IAC increased its majority stake in Tinder, a move that is believed to have valued Tinder at several billion dollars. In July 2015, Tinder was valued at $1.35 billion by Bank of America Merrill Lynch based upon an estimate of $27 per user on an estimated user base of 50 million with an additional bullish estimate of $3 billion by taking the average of the IPOs of similar companies. Analysts also estimated that Tinder had about half a million paid users within its user base which consisted mostly of free users. The monetization of the site has come through leaving the basic app free and then adding different in-app purchase options for additional functions and features.

Paid subscriptions 
Tinder launched its subscription version, Tinder Plus, in March 2015, with the functionality enabling limitless matches, whereas the free Tinder app restricts the number of right swipes in a 12-hour period. It has sparked debate by restricting the number of "likes" a free user may offer in a given length of time, as well as charging varying amounts for different age groups. The price of a Tinder Plus subscription was £14.99/US$19.99 per month for users over 28, while the service for a user 28 and under was £3.99/US$9.99 per month.

In 2016, Tinder independently increased paying members by nearly one million, while Match Group's 44 other brands added just 1.4 million.

In June 2017, Tinder launched Tinder Gold, a members-only service that offers users Tinder's most exclusive features: Passport, Rewind, Unlimited Likes, Likes You, five Super Likes per day, one Boost per month, and more profile controls. The price of a monthly membership started at $14.99 per month for users under 30 and $29.99 per month for users over 30.

As of December 2020, Tinder had 6.6 million paid users. According to a Match Group SEC filing, the growth in international and North American average subscribers was primarily driven by Tinder.

Users
Tinder is used widely throughout the world and is available in over 190 countries and 56 languages. As of September 2021, an estimated 75 million people used the app every month. In late 2014, Tinder users averaged 12 million matches per day. However, to get to those 12 million matches, users collectively made around 1 billion swipes per day. Tinder now limits users' number of available swipes per 12 hours based on an algorithm to make sure users are actually looking at profiles and not just spamming the app to rack up random matches. The minimum age to sign up and use Tinder was 18. As of June 2016, Tinder is no longer usable by anyone under 18. If minors were found to be under 18, they were banned from using Tinder until they were 18. As of April 2015, Tinder users swiped through 1.6 billion Tinder profiles and made more than 26 million matches per day. More than 558 billion matches have been made since Tinder launched in 2012.

Features
 Swipe is central to Tinder's design. The app's algorithm presents profiles to users, who then swipe right to "like" potential matches and swipe left to continue their search.
 Messaging is also a heavily utilized feature. Once a user matches with another user, they are able to exchange text messages on the app.
Face to Face is Tinder's video chat feature that allows users who have matched to see each other virtually. It was implemented in July 2020. 
 Instagram integration lets users view other users' Instagram profiles.
 Common Connections allows users to see whether they share a mutual Facebook friend with a match (a first-degree connection on Tinder) or when a user and their match have two separate friends who happen to be friends with each other (considered second-degree on Tinder).
 Tinder Gold, introduced worldwide in August 2017, is a premium subscription feature that allows users to see those who have already liked them before swiping.
 Panic button was introduced in the US in January 2020. The feature provides emergency assistance, location tracking, and photo verification.
 Traveler alert was introduced in 2019 to alert Tinder users of the LGBTQ+ community of possible penalization they are subject to when they travel to a country or geographical location that does not allow such interaction. This feature automatically hides users' profiles in countries that prohibit same-sex relationships, then allows the user to decide if they prefer to stay hidden or not.
 Plus One was announced by Tinder in October 2021 as a way for users to connect with each other on the Explore page to arrange a date for weddings. Users can signify if they are looking for or are willing to be a wedding date.

Advertising
An ad campaign launched by "The Barn" internship program of Bartle Bogle Hegarty (BBH) used Tinder profiles to promote their NYC Puppy Rescue Project. Using Facebook pet profiles, BBH was able to add them to the Tinder network. The campaign received media coverage from Slate, Inc., The Huffington Post, and others. In April 2015, Tinder revealed its first sponsored ad promoting Budweiser's next #Whatever, USA campaign.

On December 11, Tinder announced their partnership with popular artist Megan Thee Stallion for the Put Yourself Out There Challenge, giving $10,000 to users who made unique profiles.

Lawsuits 
On June 30, 2014, former vice president of marketing Whitney Wolfe filed a sexual harassment and sex discrimination suit in Los Angeles County Superior Court against IAC-owned Match Group, the parent company of Tinder. The lawsuit alleged that Rad and Mateen had engaged in discrimination, sexual harassment, and retaliation against her, while Tinder's corporate supervisor, IAC's Sam Yagan, did nothing. IAC suspended CMO Mateen from his position pending an ongoing investigation, and stated that it "acknowledges that Mateen sent private messages containing 'inappropriate content, but it believes Mateen, Rad and the company are innocent of the allegations". The suit was settled with no admission of wrongdoing, and Wolfe reportedly received over $1 million from the settlement.

In March 2018, Match Group sued Bumble, arguing that the dating app was guilty of patent infringement and of stealing trade secrets from Tinder. In June 2020, an undisclosed settlement was reached between Match Group and Bumble to settle all litigations.

In December 2018, The Verge reported that Tinder had dismissed Rosette Pambakian, the company's vice president of marketing and communication. Pambakian alleged former Match Group and IAC CEO Greg Blatt, sexually assaulted her in a hotel room following a company party in December 2016. She further accused the company of firing her when she reported the incident.

In August 2018, co-founders Sean Rad and Justin Mateen and eight other former and current executives of Tinder filed a lawsuit against Match Group and IAC, alleging that they manipulated the 2017 valuation of the company to deny them billions of dollars they were owed. The suit charges that executives of Match Group and IAC deliberately manipulated the data given to the banks, overestimating expenses and underestimating potential revenue growth, to keep the 2017 valuation artificially low. Tinder's 2017 valuation was set at $3 billion, unchanged from a valuation that had been done two years earlier, despite rapid growth in revenue and subscribers. The plaintiffs sought upwards of $2 billion in damages. The trial is scheduled to begin on November 8, 2021.

Criticism

Privacy concerns 
Critics have raised concerns about Tinder regarding issues including cybersecurity, data privacy, and public health. Public health officials in Rhode Island and Utah have claimed that Tinder and similar apps are responsible for an increase in some STDs. In February 2014, security researchers in New York found a flaw that made it possible to find users' precise locations for between 40 and 165 days. Tinder's spokesperson, Rosette Pambakian, said the issue was resolved within 48 hours. Tinder CEO Sean Rad said in a statement that shortly after being contacted, Tinder implemented specific measures to enhance location security and further obscure location data. In August 2016, two engineers found another flaw that showed all users' matches' exact locations. The location was updated every time a user logged into the app and it worked even for blocked matches. The issue was detected in March 2016, but it was not fixed until August 2016. 

In July 2017, a study published in Advances in Intelligent Systems and Computing found that Tinder users are excessively willing to disclose their personally identifiable information. In September 2017, The Guardian published an article by a journalist who requested all data that the Tinder app had recorded about her from the company and found that Tinder stores all user messages, user locations and times, and the characteristics of other users who interest a particular user, the characteristics of particular users of interest to other users, and the length of time users spend looking at particular pictures, which for the journalist amounted to 800 pages of detail.

Safety 
In 2021, Tinder partnered with and invested in Garbo, a non-profit background check company. The partnership was intended to add a feature enabling users to run background checks on their matches. Critics believe the integration of background check software discriminates against one-third of the adult working population in the US who have criminal records. Another issue that critics raised was the unreliability of background checks since they disproportionately impact people from Black and other ethnic minorities. A Prison Policy Initiative spokesperson claimed that because the US applies laws unequally, introducing criminal background checks to dating apps would filter out marginalized groups of people. Moreover, public records and court documents often contain erroneous or outdated information. Garbo does not advertise drug possession charges or traffic violations in an attempt to combat further marginalization.

In 2022, Tinder announced a partnership with the campaign group No More in an attempt to protect its users against domestic violence, especially women who are more vulnerable. The no More app feature will educate users about safe dating.

Transphobia 
In August 2015, Business Insider reported that transgender users of Tinder were being reported and banned for being transgender. The article included an interview with a trans woman who also described abusive messages she received that included transmisogyny and homophobia. In December 2017, Vice reported that the pattern of being reported and banned had continued. The article included an anecdote from American YouTuber Kat Blaque, saying that every account she had ever had on Tinder had been banned.

In March 2018, an article in The Cut reported that a trans woman sued Tinder for removing her profile and refusing to explain why it had been deleted. The article further reported that many transgender people similarly had issues with their accounts being reported and banned, some within several hours of being opened. In October 2019, PinkNews similarly reported that the reporting and banning of trans people had continued. The article stated that Tinder has "50 gender options" but continues to ban trans users for their gender identity. A trans woman is reported as saying, "the fact that the system can be abused in such a way just shows, yet again, that they [Tinder] don’t care about the trans and non-binary people using their app."

In late 2019, articles in Reuters and The Independent focused on the lack of action taken by Tinder to correct the systemic issue of transgender users' accounts being reported and banned. In August 2022, an article in The Cut again highlighted the issue of accounts of transgender people being banned. One trans woman interviewed recommended OkCupid as being more user-friendly for LGBTQ+ people.

Reception

Reviews
The New York Times wrote that the wide use of Tinder could be attributed not to what Tinder was doing right but to flaws in the models of earlier dating software, which relied on mathematical algorithms to select potential partners. Relationship experts interviewed by the newspaper stated that users used the photographs that come in succession on the app to derive cues as to social status, confidence levels, and personal interests. Marie Claire wrote that the app was "easy to use on the run," "natural," and "addictive" due to the game style of Tinder, but that "... it's hard to focus," and Tinder "is still very casual sex-focused--many are only on Tinder for a quick hook-up, so if it's a serious relationship you're after this app might not be for you."

In September 2020, Pakistan announced that it would ban five dating apps, including Tinder; this is because Pakistan's government states that apps are providing immoral or indecent content that does not comply with Pakistani law.

User behavior

Men use dating apps and websites at a higher frequency than women do—measured by frequency of use and number of users. According to Statista, as of March 2021, 75.8% of the US Tinder user base is male, while 24.2% is female. The first study on swiping strategies revealed that "men tend to like a large proportion of the women they view but receive only a tiny fraction of matches in return—just 0.6 percent", while women are much more selective about swiping but match at a 10% higher rate than men. The study also found that women are more engaged, take longer to compose their messages, and write longer messages.

According to University of Texas at Austin psychologist David Buss, "Apps like Tinder and OkCupid give people the impression that there are thousands or millions of potential mates out there. One dimension of this is the impact it has on men's psychology. When there is ... a perceived surplus of women, the whole mating system tends to shift towards short-term dating," and there is a feeling of disconnect when choosing future partners. The appearance of an abundance of potential partners may cause online daters to be less likely to choose a partner and be less satisfied with their choices of partners. Data released by Tinder in 2018 has shown that of the 1.6 billion swipes it records per day, 26 million result in matches (a match rate of approximately 1.63%).

In August 2015, journalist Nancy Jo Sales wrote in Vanity Fair that Tinder operates within a culture of users seeking sex without relationships. In 2017, the Department of Communications Studies at Texas Tech University conducted a study to see how infidelity was connected to the Tinder app. The experiment was conducted on 550 students from an unnamed university in the Southwestern United States. The students first provided their demographic information and then answered questions regarding Tinder's link to infidelity. The results showed that more than half reported having seen somebody on Tinder who they knew was in an exclusive relationship (63.9%), while 73.1% of participants reported that they knew male friends who used Tinder while in a relationship, and 56.1% reported that they had female friends who used Tinder while in a relationship. Psychologists Douglas T. Kenrick, Sara E. Gutierres, Laurie L. Goldberg, Steven Neuberg, Kristin L. Zierk, and Jacquelyn M. Krones have demonstrated experimentally that following exposure to photographs or stories about desirable potential mates, human subjects decrease their ratings of commitment to their current partners. David Buss has estimated that approximately 30 percent of the men on Tinder are married.

Prior to Tinder's launch in 2012, most online dating services matched people according to their autobiographical information, such as interests, hobbies, and future plans. Tinder, however, places a higher weight on first impressions. For social scientists studying human courtship behavior, Tinder offers a much simpler environment than its predecessors. In a 2016 study analyzing the behavior of Tinder users in New York City and London, researchers created with three profiles using stock photographs, two with actual photographs of volunteers, one with no photos whatsoever, and one that was apparently deactivated. All pictures were of people of average physical attractiveness. These profiles then liked all profiles that were presented to them, and then counted the number of returning likes. The researchers found that men liked a large proportion of the profiles they viewed, but received returning likes only 0.6% of the time, while women were much more selective but received matches 10% of the time. Men received matches at a much slower rate than women. Once they received a match, women were far more likely than men to send a message, 21% compared to 7%, but they took more time before doing so. Tyson and his team found that for the first two-thirds of messages from each sex, women sent them within 18 minutes of receiving a match compared to five minutes for men. Men's first messages had an average of 12 characters and were typical simple greetings; by contrast, initial messages by women averaged 122 characters.

By sending out questionnaires to frequent Tinder users, the researchers discovered that the reason why men tended to like a large proportion of the women they saw was to increase their chances of getting a match. This led to a feedback loop in which men liked more and more of the profiles they saw, while women could afford to be even more selective in liking profiles because of a greater probability of a match. The feedback loop's mathematical limit occurs when men like all profiles they see while women find a match whenever they like a profile. It was not known whether some evolutionarily stable strategy has emerged, nor has Tinder revealed such information.

Tyson and his team found that even though the men-to-women ratio of their data set was approximately one, the male profiles received 8,248 matches in total, while the female profiles received only 532 matches in total because the vast majority of the matches for both the male and female profiles came from male profiles (with 86 percent of the matches for the male profiles alone coming from other male profiles), leading the researchers to conclude that homosexual men were "far more active in liking than heterosexual women." On the other hand, the deactivated male account received all of its matches from women. The researchers were not sure why this happened.

See also

Timeline of online dating services
Comparison of online dating services
Stable marriage problem and the Gale–Shapley algorithm

References

External links
 
 Editorial website

Computer-related introductions in 2012
Geosocial networking
IAC (company)
Mobile social software
Online dating services of the United States
Proprietary cross-platform software
Online dating applications
American websites